Travelgenio is a Spanish online travel agency created in 2010 by Mariano Pelizzari.  The company also publishes a survey of trends and customer satisfaction in the air travel industry.

Services 
The products and services Travelgenio offers are, mainly, flights, hotels and other services such as insurances, car rental, and transfers. Travelgenio operates through some reservation systems like Amadeus CRS or Galileo, marketing the products of airlines like Iberia (airline), Vueling, Air France or KLM, among other companies. In 2020 Travelgenio and Travelport signed a renewed partnership.

References

External links
 

Travel and holiday companies of Spain
Online travel agencies
Transport companies established in 2010
Internet properties established in 2010
Spanish travel websites
Companies based in Madrid
2010 establishments in Spain